Finland competed at the 2012 Summer Paralympics in London, United Kingdom, from 29 August to 9 September 2012.

Archery

Men

|-
|align=left|Jean-Pierre Antonios
|align=left rowspan="2"|Ind. compound W1
|632
|4
|
|
| (5)L 4-6
|colspan="3"|Did not advance
|-
|align=left|Osmo Kinnunen
|627
|5
|
| (12)W 6-0
| (4)W 6-4
| (1)L 0-6
| (6)L 1-7
|4
|-
|align=left|Jere Forsberg
|align=left rowspan="2"|Ind. compound Open
|673
|2
|
|| (18)W 6-4
|| (7)W 6-0
|| (3)W 7-3
|| (1)W 6-4
||
|-
|align=left|Keijo Kallunki
|650
|12
| (21)L 0-6
|colspan=5|Did not advance
|}

Women

|-
|align=left|Saana-Maria Sinisalo
|align=left|Ind. recurve W1/W2
|523
|10
|
| (7)L''' 2-6
|colspan=4|Did not advance
|}

Athletics

Cycling

Jarmo Ollanketo
Marko Törmänen

Equestrian

Katja Karjalainen
Jaana Kivimäki

Goalball

Men's tournament

Toni Alenius
Jarno Mattila
Erkki Miinala
Ville Montonen
Tuomas Nousu
Petri Posio

Group play

Quarter-final

Semi-final

Final

Women's tournament

Katja Heikkinen
Kaisu Hynninen
Iida Kauppila
Krista Leppänen
Maija Somerkivi
Sanna Tynkkynen

Group play

Quarter-final

Semi-final

Bronze medal game

Judo

Jani Kallunki
Päivi Tolppanen

Sailing

Niko Salomaa

Shooting

Minna Sinikka Leinonen
Veli Veikko Palsamäki

Swimming

Men

Women

Table tennis

References

Nations at the 2012 Summer Paralympics
2012
2012 in Finnish sport